My Hele Hart is the debut studio album by the South African pop/opera vocal quartet Romanz.

Track listing

Charts

Weekly charts

References 

iTunes page
Kalahari.com page

2009 debut albums
Afrikaans albums
Romanz albums